James Kirkland (fl. 1730) was an Irish giant and a member of the Potsdam Giants who served under Frederick William I of Prussia, known as the "Soldier King" and was a native of Ballygar, Ardagh, County Longford. His height is described at bottom of the painting as "6 Fus 8 Zoll". From Prussian measurements this converts to 217 centimetres or 7 feet 1 inches.

Kirkland was in 1730 a footman to Baron Borck, at the time Prussian Ambassador to London. Borck, however, did not really need a footman, and had Kirkland forcibly impressed upon a Prussian ship at Portsmouth, where he was press-ganged into the Potsdam Guards.

It is claimed that he was accompanied in the regiment by other tall soldiers from Ireland. One of his fellow soldiers was the poet Tomás Ó Caiside (c.1709–1773?).

A portrait of Kirkland survives.

External links
 http://factoidz.com/the-potsdam-guards-prussias-giant-soldiers/
 http://www.exulanten.com/luise2.html
 http://www.irishtimes.com/newspaper/opinion/2009/0808/1224252235290.html 
 http://www.lange-kerls.de/Home/_13

People from County Longford
18th-century Irish people
Irish soldiers
Irish expatriates in Germany
Year of birth missing
Year of death missing